Ramsingh Ayarwal (born 1 April 1938) is an Indian politician from the Bharatiya Jana Sangh party.

Career
He was a member of the 4th Lok Sabha of India, having won the 1967 general election of India from the Sagar Lok Sabha constituency.

See also

 List of people from Madhya Pradesh

References

1938 births
India MPs 1967–1970
Bharatiya Janata Party politicians from Madhya Pradesh
Living people
Lok Sabha members from Madhya Pradesh
People from Sagar district